B*Witched are an Irish girl group consisting of twin sisters Edele and Keavy Lynch, Lindsay Armaou and Sinéad O'Carroll. Originally active between 1997 and 2002, they enjoyed success in both Europe and North America between 1998 and 2002, releasing two albums and eight singles, all of which made the UK Top 20. Their first four singles, "C'est la Vie", "Rollercoaster", "To You I Belong" and "Blame It on the Weatherman", all reached number one in the UK Singles Chart. In 2002, having sold over 3 million albums worldwide, B*Witched were dropped by their record company. Soon afterwards, when O'Carroll decided to leave, the group split up. In 2006, the Lynch sisters formed a group, Ms. Lynch, frequently performing B*Witched material at live shows.

On 18 October 2012, it was announced that B*Witched would reunite for the ITV2 reality-documentary series The Big Reunion, along with other pop groups of their time, including Liberty X, Five, Honeyz and Atomic Kitten. The show follows the six groups as they reunited for the first time in a decade and rehearsed ahead of a comeback performance at the Hammersmith Apollo on 26 February 2013. Due to the success of the show and the high demand for tickets at the Hammersmith Apollo gig, the Big Reunion lineups also embarked on an arena tour around the United Kingdom and the Republic of Ireland.

In May 2013, B*Witched unveiled a new song called "Love and Money" which served as the group's lead single from their 2014 EP, Champagne or Guinness. In 2016, the group released C'est la vie: The Collection. To celebrate their 25th anniversary, B*Witched single "Birthday" in March 2023. The single was added to the digital version of C'est la vie:The Collection.

Career

1996–98: Formation and B*Witched 

All four members of B*Witched knew each other vaguely from dancing at Digges Lane dance studios in Dublin. Sinéad O'Carroll met Keavy Lynch (one of the younger sisters of Boyzone's Shane Lynch) in a garage in the Dublin suburb of Finglas, where Keavy was working as a part-time mechanic. The two of them became friends after talking about music and the idea of being in a band. Lindsay Armaou met Keavy at a kickboxing class. In 1996, Keavy, Sinéad and Keavy's identical twin sister Edele decided to put a group together, originally called Butterfly Farm. They later became a four-piece when Armaou joined.

The group experimented with the name D'sire and Sister, before settling on B*Witched. The band members deliberately cultivated a tomboy image and, in order to appeal to a younger audience, understated their ages in their early years. Edele and Keavy's brother Shane Lynch (of the band Boyzone) helped the group find a manager, Kim Glowas. In 1997 she signed the group to Glowworm Records, the Epic Records label she ran. The label was co-run by Ray "Madman" Hedges, who produced all of B*Witched's releases.

B*Witched released their debut single "C'est la Vie" on 25 May 1998, prior to their first show at Lawmuir Primary School in Bellshill as part of Jobee's 20-year anniversary. Despite mixed reviews, it reached number one on the UK Singles Chart and in the process B*Witched became the youngest girl group to have a number one in the UK (a feat that has since been surpassed by the Sugababes and Little Mix). Following its release in the United States, the song went to number nine on the Billboard Hot 100. Subsequent singles "Rollercoaster", "To You I Belong" and "Blame It on the Weatherman" all topped the UK chart as well. They also performed the theme song for the Saturday morning cartoon Sabrina: The Animated Series. Their self-titled debut album, B*Witched, was released in October 1998, and reached number three on the UK Albums Chart and was certified 2× Platinum in the UK. The album also peaked at number 12 on the US Billboard 200 and was certified Platinum in the US.

1999–2002: Awake and Breathe, O'Carroll's departure and break up  
In 1999 B*Witched appeared on the ABBA tribute single "Thank ABBA for the Music", which reached number four in the UK, and recorded a cover of "Does Your Mother Know" for the subsequent ABBAmania album and TV special. Singing dolls of the group were made by Yaboom Toys in 1999. Along with Britney Spears, they performed the opening act for NSYNC's world tour. B*Witched's second album, Awake and Breathe, released a year after their debut, peaked at number 5 on the charts and was certified Platinum. Singles from the album were less successful than earlier releases ("Jesse Hold On" reached number 4, "I Shall Be There" number 13 and "Jump Down" number 16 in the UK). After touring Europe and America, where they co-headlined the All That Music and More Festival with LFO and Blaque, the band began work on a third album. Three new songs were recorded: "Hold On" (featured in The Princess Diaries); a cover of Toni Basil's "Mickey" (featured in Bring It On); and a cover of Wild Cherry's "Play That Funky Music". The latter two appeared on their new American EP, Across America 2000, along with live tracks and the earlier cover of "Does Your Mother Know".

In 2001, a third album was in the works, and the band had chosen "Where Will You Go?" as the new single. On 4 July 2001, B*Witched made a guest appearance on the United States daytime television medical drama, General Hospital. In October, before the group could film a music video for "Where Will You Go?”, the girls received a phone call from their manager telling them their record label Sony had dropped them. In June 2002, after one year without signing a new record deal, O'Carroll left the band, unhappy with the forced hiatus. In September 2002 the group split.

2013–present: Return, Champagne or Guinness and Touring
On 18 October 2012, it was announced that B*Witched would reunite for the ITV2 series The Big Reunion along with five other pop groups of their time—Honeyz, 911, Liberty X, Five and Atomic Kitten (Blue later joined as well). The show featured each group telling their stories of their times in their respective bands, before rehearsing together ahead of one major comeback performance at the Hammersmith Apollo. B*Witched had to hold "emotional clear the air" talks before reforming. Edele admitted that she and Sinéad had fallen out in 2006 and had not spoken to each other since: "My biggest anxiety about doing this – there's only one, and it's Sinéad, I think. It's just how I'm going to feel about being in her person again." Lindsay also said: "Some of the issues we didn't even know were necessarily there until we were faced with this opportunity that we have to work together again, then we were like, 'Oh, OK, in order for us to do this then we have to sort a few things out.' It all just came up. It's been difficult to get to this point. There's been a lot of talking, a lot of talking. But we're here now. It's very surreal being called B*Witched again because it's been 12 years."

Due to the success of The Big Reunion, the bands embarked on an arena tour around the UK and Ireland in May 2013. The groups got together to record a charity single, a cover of Wizzard's "I Wish It Could Be Christmas Everyday", for Text Santa. In March, Armaou announced that they would record new material. On 4 May, the group released a promotional single called  "Love and Money" on YouTube. On 3 October, Edele Lynch announced in an interview to Today FM that they were recording their third album. On 11 December, B*Witched made an announcement via PledgeMusic. The EP, titled Champagne or Guinness, was released on 28 September 2014. On 12 February 2016, B*Witched released the compilation album C'est la Vie – The Collection, a 36-track double album featuring tracks from their first two albums and two tracks from their 2014 Champagne or Guinness EP. B*Witched had planned to tour Australia in 2017, along with other acts including Atomic Kitten and Liberty X.

In October 2019, the band returned with a brand new single, "Hold On", a cover of the U.S. number-one hit of the same name by Wilson Phillips.

In March 2021, B*Witched started  hosting a new podcast called Starting Over with B*Witched.

In March 2023, the group released the single "Birthday" to celebrate the bands 25th anniversary, stating: "We will get to the point of an album. Right now we’re releasing singles, but the singles will keep coming and eventually they’ll be on the album [...] there’s definitely more in the pipeline".

Members
 Lindsay Armaou
 Edele Lynch
 Keavy Lynch
 Sinéad O'Carroll

Discography 

 B*Witched (1998)
 Awake and Breathe (1999)
 Champagne or Guinness (2014)

Concert tours 
Headlining
All That Music & More Tour (1999–2000)
Jump Up Jump Down Tour (1999)
B*Witched Tour (2014)

Co-headlining
The Big Reunion (2013)

References

External links 

 B*Witched on Facebook
 B*Witched on YouTube

 
Musical groups established in 1997
Musical groups disestablished in 2002
Musical groups reestablished in 2013
Irish pop music groups
Irish girl groups
Musical groups from Dublin (city)
Teen pop groups
Vocal quartets
1998 establishments in Ireland
Sibling musical groups